Keryn David Jordan (1 November 1975 – 21 October 2013) was a South African footballer who primarily played as a striker during a fifteen-year career.

Club career

Early career
He started his career in his native South Africa at Pretoria City, before transferring to Manning Rangers where he won the golden boot during the 1997–98 Premier Soccer League season with 11 goals. In the 2003/2004 season, he also led with 8 goals.

Waitakere United
Jordan then moved to New Zealand, intending to play for the New Zealand Knights in the newly formed Australian and New Zealand A-League. He was unsuccessful in this and signed with new New Zealand Football Championship team Waitakere United instead. In his first season with the club (2004/2005), he scored 15 goals in the 21 rounds, and earned the Golden Boot.

International career
Jordan earned one cap for South Africa at senior international level, in 1999.

Illness and death
In 2008, after an unexplained three months on the sideline, Jordan announced that he had been suffering from cancer for three years. He had initially been worried that it would interfere with his application for permanent residency and New Zealand citizenship, but was treated and given the all-clear by doctors, and made his comeback in a 4–1 win against Canterbury United.

On 19 March 2010, Jordan announced his retirement from all levels of domestic and international football, citing ongoing knee injuries. Jordan had not played a full game since the 2009 Club World Cup, and he felt it the right time to retire, after what he conceded was an ultimately successful career.

Jordan died of cancer on 21 October 2013, aged 37, in his hometown of Pretoria. The cancer had started as a melanoma spot thirteen years earlier, and eventually spread to his brain.

References

External links
 Auckland City FC profile
 

1975 births
2013 deaths
Deaths from cancer in South Africa
South African soccer players
New Zealand association footballers
South Africa international soccer players
Expatriate association footballers in New Zealand
White South African people
South African people of British descent
SuperSport United F.C. players
Moroka Swallows F.C. players
Waitakere United players
Auckland City FC players
Manning Rangers F.C. players
Soccer players from Pretoria
Association football forwards
New Zealand Football Championship players